Rădești (formerly Tâmpăhaza;) is a commune located in Alba County, Transylvania, Romania. It has a population of 1,398. It is composed of four villages: Leorinț (Laurentzi; Lőrincréve), Meșcreac (Weichseldorf; Meggykerék), Rădești and Șoimuș (Magyarsolymos).

At the 2011 census, 78.1% of inhabitants were Romanians, 19.3% Hungarians and 2.4% Roma. 63.7% were Romanian Orthodox, 21.4% Reformed and 14% Greek-Catholic.

Natives
Augustin Lazăr
Demetriu Radu

References

Communes in Alba County
Localities in Transylvania